The 2001 International Raiffeisen Grand Prix was a men's tennis tournament played on outdoor clay courts in Sankt Pölten in Austria and was part of the International Series of the 2001 ATP Tour. It was the 21st edition of the tournament and took place from 21 May through 27 May 2001. Unseeded Andrea Gaudenzi, who entered the tournament on a wildcard, won the singles title.

Finals

Singles

 Andrea Gaudenzi defeated  Markus Hipfl 6–0, 7–5
 It was Gaudenzi's 1st title of the year and the 4th of his career.

Doubles

 Petr Pála /  David Rikl defeated  Jaime Oncins /  Daniel Orsanic 6–3, 5–7, 7–5
 It was Pála's only title of the year and the 1st of his career. It was Rikl's 2nd title of the year and the 21st of his career.

References

International Raiffeisen Grand Prix
Hypo Group Tennis International
2001 in Austrian tennis